Lycée Français de Stavanger is a French international school in Stavanger, Norway. It was founded in 1972.

As of 2015 it served maternelle (preschool) through the second year of lycée (senior high school).

It closed in 2019 https://ee.mlfmonde.org/stavanger-lycee-francais/fermeture-du-lycee-francais-de-stavanger/

See also
 France–Norway relations
 Lycée Français René Cassin d'Oslo

References

External links
 Lycée Français de Stavanger 

French international schools in Norway
Stavanger
1972 establishments in Norway
Educational institutions established in 1972